Family Tradition is the twenty-ninth studio album by American country music artist Hank Williams Jr. It was released in April 1979 by Curb Records, his third studio album for the label.

Composition 

Family Tradition shows influences from R&B and soul music.

Critical and commercial success
Family Tradition was a significant success, both critically and commercially for Williams. It peaked at number 3 on the Billboard Top Country Albums chart, making it Williams' first Top 5 album since 1969's Live at Cobo Hall. Four of the ten tracks were released as singles, the first single being "I Fought the Law". "I Fought the Law" was originally a hit for the rock & roll group The Bobby Fuller Four in the early 1960s and the song was a moderate success for Williams, peaking at number 15 on the Billboard Hot Country Singles & Tracks chart. The follow up singles, "Old Flame, New Fire" and "To Love Somebody" had little success, only peaking at number 54 and number 49 respectively. The final single, the album's title track, "Family Tradition", would become one of Williams' most popular and recognized songs. It peaked at number 4 on the Hot Country Singles & Tracks chart, his first Top 10 single since 1974. Williams' performance received rave reviews by critics and he received his first Grammy nomination for Best Country Vocal Performance, Male. The album was also a significant commercial success for Williams, becoming only his second album to be certified Gold by the RIAA.

Track listing

Singles

Personnel
Hank Williams, Jr. - vocals, guitar
Reggie Young - electric guitar
Al Bruno, Jay Graydon, Jerry Wallace - guitar
Mac McAnally, Richard Bennett - acoustic guitar
Brad Felton - steel guitar
Bob Wray, Ray Pohlman, Reinie Press - bass
Charlie Daniels - fiddle
Alan Lindgren, Clayton Ivey, Don Randi, Greg Mathieson - keyboards
Billy M. Thomas, Chet McCracken, Roger Clark - drums
King Errisson - percussion
Muscle Shoals Horns - horns
Carol Chase, Jim Dugan, Karen McClain, Pam Johnze, Pat Erickson, Susie Allanson - background vocals
David Turner, Henry Ferber, James Getzoff, Murray Adler, Robert Lee Adcock, Sid Sharp, William Kurasch - violin
Jesse Ehrlich, Judy Perett, Raymond Kelley, Robert Lee Adcock - cello
Richard Hieronymus, John D'Andrea - arrangements
Technical
Jerry Hall, Leslie King, Mary Beth McLemore, Michael Lietz, Ron Treat - engineer
Jim Shea - photography

Charts

Weekly charts

Year-end charts

References
Notes

Sources
 Family Tradition album at CMT.com

Hank Williams Jr. albums
1979 albums
Albums produced by Jimmy Bowen
Curb Records albums